is a manga and cross-media tie-in to the 2008 film Cloverfield. The Shōnen Ace magazine published the manga on Kadokawa Shoten's website. It was released once a month and consists of four chapters. The story details the lives of two students seeking shelter before what may seem to be the Chuai incident seen in the film's viral marketing material, and their internal conflicts when the Cloverfield monster makes an appearance. One of the students is being tracked by a cult that has connections to both the monster and the fictional Japanese drilling company Tagruato.

Plot
The story centers on two teenagers, Kishin Aiba and Aiko Sasahara, struggling to learn more about an incident in what may seem to be the events before the Chuai incident all the while being under siege by the monster itself before its untimely attack in New York City.

The first part centers on one of them, Kishin Aiba, and partly about the creature being taken captive by Tagruato. The second part centers more about Aiko Sasahara herself, her esteem to make Kishin acknowledge himself more and the assault of the monster on the Tokyo coastlines. Several third party characters from Tagruato and the ships make several appearances, such as the sailor Kurosaki.

In the second part, Mr. Aiba in the Tagruato headquarters gives an ominous warning about the events about to happen. After hearing it all on a news broadcast, Kishin and Aiko set off for shelter, the two bond together along the way. They arrive in Aiba's apartment, to acquire autographs from one of the popstars that promotes the drink Slusho! at the behest of Aiko. Kishin, reluctant at first, sees medical records of himself. The two come into an encounter with a mysterious cult intending to use Kishin in a twisted experiment or a dark ritual that heavily ties him to the monster and some of Tagruato and Slusho!'s darker intentions, the two separate after a struggle with the cult. Aiko encounters the military and tells them to help Kishin, but they tell her that they'll only do it if she leaves with the rest of the troops to a nearby shelter. Aiko goes to the shelter, however they ignore her demand. Aiko vows to rescue Kishin. The cult is depicted bearing masks that resembles the monster's face and carries beads or charms that holds the design of the monster's claws at every member's person.

In the third part, Mr. Aiba arrives and kills the cult members. He tells Kishin that Mrs. Aiba sabotaged a Tagruato experiment involving the monster called Splinter of Amnion (known to the cult as God's vestige) and fused its DNA (in the form of a tiny ball) with Kishin's in order for the cult to use him as a vessel to control the monster, as the Splinter requires a host. She was killed by Tagruato as a consequence. Kishin is the only person on the planet who has the monster's DNA inside his body, and he can also control it. Mr. Aiba tells Kishin that he has to die for the sake of humanity, and he is willing to die along with him. Mr. Aiba activates a switch that causes an explosion, but the monster arrives and shields Kishin with its hand. Meanwhile, Aiko escapes the shelter and kills one of the monster's parasites. She then witnesses Kishin standing in front of the monster. Kishin communicates with the monster and recalls his past. He realizes that his entire life has been nothing but misery and betrayal, and ends up succumbing into madness and rides on top of the monster's head. Kishin decides to abandon his useless self and destroy the cruel world that had been tormenting him. Kishin and the monster begin to mobilize.

In the final installment of the manga, Kishin and the monster cause havoc throughout the city before returning to the school. A group of parasites begin to attack three bullies, and they are shocked that when Kishin walks up to them, the parasites are not attacking him. He orders the parasites to assault the bullies, knocking out two of them. However, the third  is saved by Aiko. Aiko then forcefully talks some sense into Kishin, revealing that she has feelings for him and after saving her from falling rubble, they get the two other bullies with one assisting them and take shelter in a room. While in there, Kishin cuts his hair, signifying his apology and new resolve and announces that he will face the creature alone. He runs outside, and comes to a stop right in front of it. He tells the monster that he has the Splinter of Amnion. The monster is in dismay (as can actually be seen in one panel). In rage, it consumes Kishin with one of its underbelly feeding tubes. While trying to use the orb to project Kishin's emotions, it flies into a rage after feeling the many emotions Kishin had felt over his life, until stopping at the one thing that he cared for most: Aiko. After a soldier shoots the monster in the eye, it roars one more time. Wounded and shaken by Kishin's revelation, it returns to the ocean and sinks down. While going down, it sees what appears to be a giant egg, before allowing itself to be absorbed to be at peace. It is then revealed that there are several more eggs akin to a nest, implying that there are actually many more monsters (and that the monster from the manga is different from the one from the film). Kishin is found floating on a piece of wood, and is brought back to the ravaged city to a joyous Aiko. They embrace as they reunite, Kishin finally having found the one true thing he cares for in his life.

Background
The manga has a stronger focus on the viral-marketing materials such as Slusho! and Tagruato than the film. There are several new revelations regarding the nature and biology of the monster.

See also
List of comics based on films

References

External links
 (defunct since June 2008)

Comics based on films
Spin-offs
Cloverfield (franchise)
Horror anime and manga
Fiction about cults
Shōnen manga